Bala Ganj Afruz (also Romanized as Bālā Ganj Afrūz) is a village in Babol Kenar Rural District, Babol Kenar District, Babol County, Mazandaran Province, Iran. At the 2006 census, its population was 481, in 118 families.

References 

Populated places in Babol County